Idle Hour is a former Vanderbilt estate that is located in Oakdale on Long Island in Suffolk County, New York. It was completed in 1901 for William Kissam Vanderbilt. Once part of Dowling College, the mansion is one of the largest houses in the United States.

History

In 1878, Alva and William Kissam Vanderbilt began building a lavish, wooden 110-room home known as Idle Hour, on a  estate on the Connetquot River.  The building, initially completed in 1882, was designed by Richard Morris Hunt of Hunt & Hunt (an American who studied at the École des Beaux-Arts in Paris), continuously added to until the home was destroyed by fire on April 15, 1899, while his son, Willie K. Vanderbilt, was honeymooning there.  Willie and his new wife, Virginia Fair Vanderbilt, escaped the fire.  His daughter Consuelo had also honeymooned there when she married the Charles Spencer-Churchill, 9th Duke of Marlborough in 1895.

It was promptly rebuilt of red brick and gray stone in the English Country Style, with exquisite furnishings, for $3 million. The building, at the time was considered among the finest homes in America, was designed by Hunt's son, Richard Howland Hunt. The rebuilt "estate included nearly all of Oakdale, 290 or 300 buildings, a herd of steer and a paddlewheel steamer to ferry guests up and down the Connetquot River alongside the mansion."  Around 1902, an addition was made to Idle Hour by the prominent architectural firm of Warren & Wetmore.

Later ownership
After Vanderbilt's death in 1920, the mansion went through several phases and visitors, including a brief stay during Prohibition by gangster Dutch Schultz. Around that time, cow stalls, pig pens and corn cribs on the farm portion of Idle Hour were converted into a short-lived bohemian artists' colony, known as the Royal Fraternity of Master Metaphysicians, that included figures such as George Elmer Browne and Roman (Bon) Bonet-Sintas as well as sculptress Catherine Lawson, costume designer Olga Meervold, and pianist Claude Govier, and Francis Gow-Smith and his wife Carol.

In 1963, Adelphi College purchased the estate and, in 1968, spun the campus off as Dowling College (named after city planner and philanthropist Robert W. Dowling).  In March 1974, the home sustained its second fire and required a $3 million renovation.  The estate was home to Dowling College, a private co-educational college, until the college closed in August 2016.

In 2017, Idle Hour and the Dowling Campus were set to be auctioned off.  In 2018, the U.S. Bankruptcy Court in Central Islip approved the $14 million purchase of the  site. by Mercury International LLC of Delaware, an affiliate of NCF Capital Ltd. which owes over $3 million dollars in back taxes to Suffolk County.

Largest homes in America
The 70,000 sq. ft. mansion is tied for the 15th largest house in the United States of America with Woodlea in Briarcliff Manor, New York (built for his sister Margaret and brother-in-law Elliott Fitch Shepard in 1895) and Lynnewood Hall in Elkins Park, Pennsylvania (built for Peter A. B. Widener in 1900).

Gallery

See also
List of Gilded Age mansions

References
Notes

Sources

External links

Idle Hour, Town of Islip, Suffolk County at Preservation Long Island
The Gilded Age, The Vanderbilt's and Idle Hour video on YouTube.

Vanderbilt family
Vanderbilt family residences
Palaces in the United States
Dowling College
Houses in Suffolk County, New York
Residential buildings completed in 1901
Gilded Age mansions